The World Skate Europe - Rink Hockey, formerly known as Comité Européen de Rink-Hockey, is a technical committee within World Skate Europe responsible for the governing of rink hockey (or roller hockey) in Europe.

European Competitions

National teams 
Men
 European Roller Hockey Championship
 European Roller Hockey Junior Championship (U-20)
 European Roller Hockey Juvenile Championship (U-17)
 Latin Cup (between U-23 teams of France, Italy, Portugal and Spain)
Women
 European Women's Roller Hockey Championship
 European Women's Roller Hockey Junior Championship
 European Women's Roller Hockey Juvenile Championship
 U17 Female Tournament

Clubs 
 Euroleague
 Women's Female League
 World Skate Europe Cup
 Continental Cup
 U17 Female Club Tournament

World Championships
National teams take part every two years in the rink hockey World Cup, which is now part of the World Roller Games organised by World Skate.
 Men's Rink Hockey World Cup
 Women's Roller Hockey World Cup
 U20 Men's World Championship

European National Rink Hockey leagues
Austria
Belgium
England
France
Germany
Italy
Israel
Netherlands
Portugal
Spain
Spain women's
Switzerland

See also
Roller hockey rankings
 Nations Cup

References

External links
Official website

Roller hockey in Europe
Rink